Sautee Nacoochee (or Sautee-Nacoochee) is a census-designated place in White County, Georgia, United States, near Sautee Creek in the Appalachian foothills of northeast Georgia, approximately  north of Atlanta. The nearest incorporated town is the tourist destination of Helen.

Geography
Sautee Nacoochee is located at longitude −83.68094, latitude 34.67994.

Origin of names
The meaning of Sautee Nacoochee's name is uncertain.  A 1734 land grant between Great Britain and the Cherokee lists Nacoochee or Nagutsi as a Cherokee town. The South Carolina Historical and Genealogical Magazine. 19 (4): 157–161].  The meaning of this Cherokee placename is unknown.  "Sautee" is an anglicized version of a Cherokee placename "I-tsa-ti" that was used to describe several Cherokee places.  James Mooney indicates that common anglicized forms of the name include Echota, Chota, and Chote.  I-tsa-ti is a significant placename for the Cherokee as it was the name of their ancient capital, an important "peace town" and it is the name that was used for their new capital, established in the 19th century, New Echota 

Others speculate that this placename combines two place names of Muscogee origin. Sautee, an anglicized name of a tribe of Muscogee Native Americans, known as the Sawate, which means "Raccoon People." Nacoochee could be the anglicization of the Cherokee pronunciation of the Muscogee word, Nokose, which means "bear."  However, James Mooney also thought it might have some connection with the name of the Yuchee Indians.

A state historic marker states that the location was visited by Hernando de Soto in 1540 AD. However, a study of the route taken by De Soto by a team of Southeastern university professors in the 1980s placed his route far to the north.

Nearby Yonah Mountain is the site of a folktale where a beautiful Cherokee maiden named Nacoochee fell in love with the Chickasaw warrior Sautee. When their love was forbidden by the tribal elders, a war party followed the eloping lovers and threw Sautee off the mountain, with Nacoochee then jumping to her death, a Lover's Leap. This "Lover's Leap" story is identical to the story in Lookout Mountain's Rock City attraction. Although he did not invent the legend, George Williams, the son of one of the original white settlers, popularized it in his 1871 Sketches of Travel in the Old and New World.

Sautee Valley Historic District
 

The Sautee Valley Historic District (adjacent to the Nacoochee Valley Historic District) is a historic district centered on the community of Sautee Nacoochee. It was added to the National Register of Historic Places in 1986 and has agricultural, architectural, and historic significance.  The district includes the location of pre-historic villages and more recent buildings and structures from after American settlers came to the area.  Spanish explorers sought gold in this valley, as did settlers who were seeking their fortune in the Georgia Gold Rush.  The center point of the Sautee Valley Historic District is the intersection of Georgia State Route 255 and Lynch Mountain Road.

Sautee Nacoochee Center
Sautee Nacoochee is most noted for the Sautee Nacoochee Center, a cultural and community center housed in the restored Nacoochee schoolhouse.  The center was founded by the Sautee-Nacoochee Community Association (SNCA), which was also responsible for getting both Sautee and Nacoochee Valleys placed on the National Register of Historic Places.

In September 2006, the Folk Pottery Museum of Northeast Georgia opened on the grounds of the Sautee Nacoochee Center.  The Pottery Museum's new facility, designed by Atlanta architect Robert M. Cain, features a  main exhibit floor that houses more than 150 vessels on permanent display and has space for additional temporary exhibits.

The numerous cultural programs at the Sautee Nacoochee Center led to Sautee Nacoochee being designated as one of "The 100 Best Small Arts Towns in America" in a book by the same name written by John Villani.

See also
Nacoochee Mound
Rabun Gap-Nacoochee School
Stovall Mill Covered Bridge
Nacoochee Valley Historic District

Nearby towns
Helen, Georgia
Cleveland, Georgia

References

Resources
2005 In the Shadow of Yonah: A History of White County, Georgia.  Garrison Baker, Brasstown Creek Publications, Cleveland, GA.
c1922 Mrs J. E. Wickle, Clarksville, Georgia  "A History of the Early Settlers of Nacoochee Valley March 10, 1822" in "Habersham County, Geoegia History" at Georgia Genealogy Trails, presented by the Georgia Genealogy Trails Group.

External links
Images from the Nacoochee Valley
Sautee Nacoochee Center
Folk Pottery Museum of Northeast Georgia
Sautee Nacoochee Valleys Associations
National Register of Historical Places.
Nacoochee Valley State Historical Marker

Historic districts on the National Register of Historic Places in Georgia (U.S. state)
Geography of White County, Georgia
Census-designated places in Georgia (U.S. state)
National Register of Historic Places in White County, Georgia